Guyjeh Qaleh-ye Sofla (also Romanized as Gūyjeh Qal‘eh-ye Soflá; also known as Gowjeh Qal‘eh-ye Soflá and) is a village in Quri Chay-ye Gharbi Rural District, Saraju District, Maragheh County, East Azerbaijan Province, Iran. At the 2006 census, its population was 62, in 13 families.

References 

Towns and villages in Maragheh County